Alnmouth (also known as Alnmouth for Alnwick) is a railway station on the East Coast Main Line, which runs between  and . It is owned by Network Rail and managed by Northern Trains.

History
The station was opened on 1 July 1847 as Bilton by the Newcastle and Berwick Railway and from 1854 run by the North Eastern Railway. On 19 August 1850 it became the junction for the Alnwick branch line and was significantly upgraded by the NER in 1887–88. On 2 May 1892 the station's name was changed to Alnmouth.

It became part of the London and North Eastern Railway during the Grouping of 1923. The station then passed on to the North Eastern Region of British Railways on nationalisation in 1948.  The Alnwick branch service was withdrawn in January 1968, with freight traffic ending in October the same year.  The station had an additional platform face on the 'down' (northbound) side for use by branch trains, but this lost its track in the early 1970s after the branch closed (along with the buildings on that side) and was removed altogether prior to the station being refurbished in 2004.  The main building on the southbound platform is not original – it was erected in 1987 to replace the original structures constructed when the Alnwick branch opened in 1850.

When Sectorisation was introduced, the station was served by the Intercity Sector until the privatisation of British Rail.

Facilities

The station is staffed, with the ticket office on platform 1 open every day of the week (06:40-18:15 Mon-Sat, 10:20-21:30 Sundays). A self-service ticket machine is also provided (this can be used to collect pre-paid tickets as well as for use when the booking office is closed). There is a waiting shelter and help point on platform 2 as well as a waiting room, vending machine and toilets on platform 1. Level access is available to both platforms via lifts in the footbridge. Train running information is offered via automated announcements, digital displays and timetable posters.

Services

Services at Alnmouth are operated by Northern Trains, CrossCountry, London North Eastern Railway and TransPennine Express.

These services combine to give a roughly hourly off-peak service with additional services during the peak hours.

Both southbound services on weekdays and the morning service on Saturdays continue beyond Newcastle to  via .

References

Sources

External links 

Railway stations in Northumberland
DfT Category E stations
Former North Eastern Railway (UK) stations
Railway stations in Great Britain opened in 1847
Railway stations served by CrossCountry
Railway stations served by London North Eastern Railway
Northern franchise railway stations
Railway stations served by TransPennine Express
Alnwick
1847 establishments in England